Ameli is a populated place in western Eritrea.

References

Ameli, Eritrea

Populated places in Eritrea